Chowrasta "Intersection" lit. where four roads meet) is a historical public square in the Victorian era hill resort town of Darjeeling in the state of West Bengal, India. Located in the heart of the town it was the fashionable place of assembly for residents and visitors in the 18th century. Chowrasta is situated on the ridge of the Darjeeling hill range and is now a focal center of tourist attraction and a popular spot for the residents to assemble, leisure or just stroll in the tranquility that that part of the hill station offers.

Geography 

It came into being during the Victorian era in the mid 18th century owing to Darjeeling's cool climate, which was similar to that of London, the British established a hill station for its officials there.

The square is lined with old yet prominent heritage stores (the oldest being Oxford Book & Stationery) towards the west and an open vista of rolling hills, snow peaks and shadowed valleys on the east, all under a deep blue sky surrounded by very old pine trees.

Numerous benches are dotted all around the promenade for people to sit and watch 'life go by' (local or native residents were refrained for sitting on these benches during the British rule in India). Although it is closed to all vehicles, Chowrasta is well connected to Darjeeling town and is at an accessible proximity from all parts of the Darjeeling hill range. Two main road arteries of the town, Nehru Road and Dr Zakir Hussain Road, culminate at Chowrasta and so do the two ends of Mall Road which winds around Observatory Hill and Mahakal Temple. Both ends of the Mall Road meet at Chowrasta from the north. There are few other narrow roads and footpaths which terminate and originate at Chowrasta.

Social and tourist significance 
Chowrasta is the heart and social center of Darjeeling and it witnesses many social, cultural, educational and political activities throughout the year. Few coffee shops and restaurants have mushroomed around it over the years and with mobile vendors on foot selling tea and snacks on the square itself. During tourist season one can enjoy a leisurely pony ride on the Mall Road.

Statues, monuments and developments

Bhanu Bhakta statue 
On the far North of the square stands a good sized golden concrete statue of Nepali poet Shri Bhanubhakta Acharya stood a brown granite plinth facing the open flat as if to watch over the souls who visit there. Initially, a 'bust above' statue of the Acharya was erected on 17 June 1949 and a full life sized figure reinstalled on 13 July 1996, commissioned by the Nepali Sahitya Sammelan.

In 2014 a park located behind the statue (North) was developed into a stepped concrete platform to give way for public events.

Water fountain and Hawa Ghar 
Immediately after the entrance from Nehru Road (South end of Chowrasta) is a water fountain ornamented with concrete golden colored fishes (perhaps koi) and pelicans, however the fountain ceased to operate or spout water since long due to the scarcity of water in Darjeeling.

The Hawa Ghar (translation: wind house) is a permanent roofed concrete stage like structure on the east edge of Chowrasta where cultural programs, performances and the occasional political speeches take place (historically local political speeches are limited to Chowk Bazar, a less glamorous part to town).

Pigeons 

Chaurasta, like all city squares has its share of pigeon population and feeding them is still a popular activity among the elderly and the tourists. Their droppings disfigure the Bhanubhakta statue and other stonework and the birds not considered a health or public hazard yet.

See also 
 Mahakal Temple
 Darjeeling
 Observatory Hill, Darjeeling

Gallery of pictures

References

External links 
 Chowrasta video
 Old pictures of Darjeeling

Tourist attractions in Darjeeling
Darjeeling
Hill stations in West Bengal